CPHA or CPhA may refer to:
 Canadian Pharmacists Association
 Cyanophycin synthase (L-aspartate-adding), an enzyme
 Cyanophycin synthase (L-arginine-adding), an enzyme